Emily Anne Whitmire (born May 24, 1991) is an American mixed martial artist (MMA) who currently competes in the Strawweight division of the Invicta FC. She has previously competed in the Ultimate Fighting Championship (UFC).

Background
The daughter of Mitch and Tiffany Whitmire, she was born in Washougal, Washington. Her father – a Washington state wrestling champion – died in a car accident when she was mere months old. Her family moved to Camas, Washington, and then to Vancouver where she graduated from Skyview High School. Emily grew up barrel racing horses, dreaming of racing in the National Finals Rodeo.

Inebriated after sneaking into a bar with a fake ID as an 18-year-old, Whitmire took a grappling match with Lisa Ellis and was inspired about the sport despite losing. After the incident, she started training in a Portland gym and taking amateur matches before being invited to train at Xtreme Couture in 2017.

Mixed martial arts career

Early career 
Whitmire started her professional MMA career in 2015 and amassed a record of 2–1 prior to participating in The Ultimate Fighter 26 UFC TV mma competition series which she was subsequently signed by UFC after the show.

The Ultimate Fighter
In August 2017, it was announced that Whitmire was one of the fighters featured on The Ultimate Fighter 26, UFC TV series, where the process to crown the UFC's inaugural 125-pound women's champion will take place. In the opening round, Whitmire faced Christina Marks and she won the fight via a submission in round one. In the quarterfinals, she faced Roxanne Modafferi and lost the bout via technical knockout.

Ultimate Fighting Championship
Whitmire made her UFC debut on December 1, 2017 on The Ultimate Fighter 26 Finale against Gillian Robertson. She lost the fight via submission in round one.

Her next fight came on July 7, 2018 at UFC 226 against Jamie Moyle. She won the fight via a unanimous decision.

On February 10, 2019, Whitmire faced Aleksandra Albu at UFC on ESPN 1. She won the fight via submission just one minute into the first round.

Whitmire faced promotional newcomer Amanda Ribas on June 29, 2019 at UFC on ESPN 3. She lost the fight via rear-naked choke submission in the second round.

Whitmire was scheduled to face Polyana Viana on March 7, 2020 at UFC 248. At the weigh-ins, Whitmire weighed in at 117.5 pounds, 1.5 pounds over the strawweight non-title fight limit of 116. She was fined 20% of her purse and her bout with Polyana Viana was expected to proceed as scheduled at a catchweight. Subsequently, Whitmire was hospitalized the day of the event and the fight was cancelled. The pair was rescheduled on August 29, 2020 at UFC Fight Night 175 in a flyweight bout. Whitmire lost the fight via an armbar submission in round one.

Whitmire was expected to face Hannah Cifers on February 27, 2021 at UFC Fight Night: Rozenstruik vs. Gane.  However, Cifers pulled out due to undisclosed reasons and was replaced by Sam Hughes.  In turn, Whitmire was removed from the bout on February 14 due to undisclosed reasons, and the bout was cancelled.

Whitmire was expected to face Cory McKenna at UFC Fight Night 192 on September 18, 2021. However, McKenna was pulled from the event for undisclosed reasons and she was replaced by Hannah Goldy. Whitmire lost the fight via an armbar in round one.

After the loss, Whitmire was announced to be no longer part of the UFC roster.

Invicta Fighting Championships 
Whitmire was scheduled to face Hilarie Rose on January 12, 2022 at Invicta FC 45. The bout was scratched due to unknown reasons.

Fury Fighting Championships 
Whitmire was scheduled to face Celine Haga on March 27, 2022 at Fury FC 59 but the bout was postponed after Whitmire suffered an injury. The bout was rescheduled to take place at Fury FC 67 on August 14, 2022 but was cancelled once again.

Mixed martial arts record

|-
|Loss
|align=center|4–5
|Hannah Goldy
| Submission (armbar)
| UFC Fight Night: Smith vs. Spann
| 
| align=center| 1
| align=center| 4:17
|Las Vegas, Nevada, United States
| 
|-
|Loss
|align=center|4–4
|Polyana Viana
|Submission (armbar)
|UFC Fight Night: Smith vs. Rakić
|
|align=center|1
|align=center|1:53
|Las Vegas, Nevada, United States
|
|-
|Loss
|align=center| 4–3
|Amanda Ribas
|Submission (rear-naked choke)
|UFC on ESPN: Ngannou vs. dos Santos 
|
|align=center|2
|align=center|2:10
|Minneapolis, Minnesota, United States
|
|-
|Win
|align=center| 4–2
|Aleksandra Albu
|Submission (rear-naked choke)
|UFC on ESPN: Ngannou vs. Velasquez
|
|align=center| 1
|align=center| 1:01
|Phoenix, Arizona, United States
|
|-
|Win
|align=center| 3–2
|Jamie Moyle
|Decision (unanimous)
|UFC 226
|
|align=center| 3
|align=center| 5:00
|Las Vegas, Nevada, United States
|
|-
|Loss
|align=center| 2–2
|Gillian Robertson
|Submission (armbar)
|The Ultimate Fighter: A New World Champion Finale
|
|align=center| 1
|align=center| 2:12
|Las Vegas, Nevada, United States
|
|-
|Win
|align=center| 2–1
|Ronni Nanney
|Decision (unanimous)
|Extreme Beatdown: Beatdown 20
|
|align=center| 3
|align=center| 5:00
|New Town, North Dakota, United States
|
|-
|Loss
|align=center| 1–1
|Kelly D'Angelo
|Submission (guillotine choke)
|RFA 44
|
|align=center| 2
|align=center| 3:46
|St. Charles, Missouri, United States
|
|-
|Win
|align=center| 1–0
|Emily Ducote
|Decision (unanimous)
|Freestyle Cage Fighting 50
|
|align=center| 3
|align=center| 5:00
|Shawnee, Oklahoma, United States
|
|-

|-
| Loss
| align=center | 1–1
| Roxanne Modafferi
| TKO (elbows)
|rowspan=2| The Ultimate Fighter: A New World Champion
|  (air date)
| align=center | 1
| align=center | 4:59
|rowspan=2| Las Vegas, Nevada, United States
| 
|-
| Win
| align=center | 1–0
| Christina Marks
| Verbal Submission (armbar)
|  (air date)
| align=center | 1
| align=center | 0:40
|

See also
List of female mixed martial artists

References

External links
 
 

Living people
1991 births
Strawweight mixed martial artists
Flyweight mixed martial artists
Mixed martial artists utilizing Brazilian jiu-jitsu
American practitioners of Brazilian jiu-jitsu
Female Brazilian jiu-jitsu practitioners
American female mixed martial artists
Mixed martial artists from Montana
Sportspeople from Portland, Oregon
Ultimate Fighting Championship female fighters
21st-century American women